= Prehistoric Life (book) =

2009 book edited by Angeles Gavira Guerrero and Peter Frances

Prehistoric Life: The Definitive Visual History of Life on Earth
- Editor: Angeles Gavira Guerrero; Peter Frances
- Language: English
- Subject: Paleontology
- Genre: Nature
- Publisher: DK
- Publication date: October 5, 2009
- Pages: 512
- ISBN: 0-7566-5573-0

Prehistoric Life is a non-fiction encyclopedia edited by Angeles Gavira Guerrero and Peter Frances. The full title of the book is Prehistoric Life: The Definitive Visual History of Life on Earth. The 512-page book was published by DK in 2009.

== Reception ==
Saying it had a "wealth of scientific information", Shauna Yusko of Booklist praised the book, writing, "The collection of full-color photographs of fossils (ranging from spore to dinosaur) and skeletons show amazing detail and clarity." In a positive review, the Courier Journal reviewer Scott Coffman wrote, "The intimate photographs, fossil scans, and CGI illustrations number over 2,500, with which the producers of this tome provide a history of life more thorough than that provided by any museum." The Globe and Mail said the book presents its information about the history of life on Earth in "colourful, well-illustrated, bite-sized morsels" and is "a reference book to savour".
